Pinoy Big Brother: Otso is the eighth main (fourteenth overall) season of Pinoy Big Brother which premiered on November 10, 2018 and ended on August 4, 2019 on ABS-CBN. This is the fourth special edition of taking different batches, civilian adults and teenagers, together to compete to win. Toni Gonzaga and Robi Domingo reprised their roles as hosts. Alex Gonzaga, who hosted All In, returned to the show together with former winners Kim Chiu and Melai Cantiveros as new hosts. Bianca Gonzalez reprised her role as host upon the entry of Batch 2 Star Dreamers.

Four batches of housemates, two civilian adults and two teenager groups, compete to be the winner of their respective batches. By the fifth batch, all finalists from each batch return to compete for eight slots in the finale. The show concluded with Yamyam Gucong being declared as the winner of the whole season.

This was the longest season of Pinoy Big Brother yet, having reached 268 days—surpassing Lucky 7 by 32. This season is the third longest season of Big Brother worldwide and also had the second highest number of housemates in a season (58), trailing Big Brother Germany’s fifth and sixth seasons, which lasted for 365 and 363 days respectively, and had 59 housemates each.

Development

Auditions
Auditions for this season has been part of Star Hunt: The Grand Kapamilya Auditions, ABS-CBN's auditions caravan, which started on April 20, 2018. 55,373 auditionees took part, auditioning for other upcoming reality shows like The Voice of the Philippines, Pilipinas Got Talent, and World of Dance Philippines. Several potential housemates have been featured in Star Hunt'''s companion show.

Other contentPinoy Big Brother: Otso Gold returned as a companion show on November 12, 2018, as part of the Kapamilya Gold block. A house livestream also aired on iWant and TFC Online. An additional online companion show called PBB Bring 8 On!, which streamed simultaneously with the primetime TV program, also aired live via show's various social media accounts; it was hosted by Dawn Chang of Pinoy Big Brother: 737, Fifth Solomon of Pinoy Big Brother: All In, and Pamu Pamorada of Pinoy Big Brother: Unlimited.

An online show, YouthTube, which was hosted by Robi Domingo and Bianca Gonzales commenced on November 22, 2018. It talked about the different issues that arose in the house, particularly in the first batch of teen housemates.

Overview
Logo change and subtitle
The Otso in the season title is a Filipino language rendering of the Spanish word ocho ("eight"), indicating the season number. This season saw another logo change from the previous season: an eye logo using motifs from the Philippine flag (from which producers customized the new generic eye logo of Big Brother), atop the show's title and enclosed by an outline of a house. The adaption of the new generic franchise logo is the first among all the franchises worldwide.

Timeslot
The weekday primetime program of the show aired at 10:15 p.m. on weekdays after the last primetime teleserye in the primetime program block of the network. An afternoon edition titled Pinoy Big Brother: Otso Gold aired at 5:15 p.m. after Los Bastardos.

The weekend primetime program was originally aired at 7:30 p.m. during the batch 1 teens; however, after the first season of I Can See Your Voice ended, Pinoy Big Brother: Otso moved its timeslot to 10:00 p.m. on Saturdays and 9:30 p.m. on Sundays in order to give the timeslot to World of Dance Philippines since the batch 2 adults.

House changes

This season showed a major revamp in the house layout. On September 7, 2018, Director Laurenti Dyogi made a vlog about the reconstruction of the house. The new house design was finally unveiled on November 7, 2018 during its house blessing. Several housemates from previous seasons have visited the house and have taken pictures for their social media accounts. Official house photos were released on their Facebook page on November 10, 2018. The management opened its doors to 888 visitors to tour the House for 8 minutes on November 10, 2018.

From his livestream, Dyogi has stated that the show has upgraded to using HD PTZ cameras, making Otso the first season to fully broadcast in high definition and in 16:9 aspect ratio (Lucky 7s Vietnam leg was shown in 16:9, but the show reverted to 4:3 upon the housemates' return to the Philippines). It was worth noting that the one-way mirror system, used in earlier seasons for cameramen to capture events in the house, was no longer present.

Show format
Since its official announcement on October 20, 2018, much information about this season has not been made public until November 9, 2018, where Dyogi published a livestream talking about it.

Four batches of housemates, civilians, and teenagers, came into the House in alternating order, starting with the teens. Each batch would comprise only eight official housemates. At the beginning of each batch's stay, 16 shortlisted contestants, known in the show as Star Dreamers, would take part in different tasks to determine who will be given housemate status, until eight are chosen. Star Dreamers who were unsuccessful in getting a spot in the House are sent to Camp Star Hunt, where they would be given tasks to determine among them the next person to be an official housemate. Every eviction, as one official housemate goes, a new one from the Camp takes their place. A new Star Dreamer will be introduced to the Camp, returning the number of housemates and Star Dreamers to eight. This is repeated for 6 weeks. By the seventh week, housemates would be participating in challenges or face the public vote, as part of the eviction process, until four are left. The public, then, decides, from the four, who they want to win for that batch. By the end of 8 weeks, the current batch leaves the House, and a batch winner is crowned, although the results were concealed until three more batches have gone through the same process. Once all batches are done, all batch winners would come back to the House, along with four more housemates from previous batches, chosen by the public, to form the final eight housemates who would battle to win the season.

This format was followed through on the batch 1. However, significant format changes were put in place as the show went on. By batch 2, Big Brother decided who would be an official housemate, and the housemates' stay was extended to 88 days—from the original 8 weeks or 56 days. By batch 3, all Star Dreamers eventually became housemates, entering the House by groups until Day 156. By batch 4, Camp Star Hunt was dropped, and the batch started with 12 official housemates, exiting the House via eviction without a replacement, and the housemates' stay was only 6 weeks—from the original 8 weeks or 56 days. By the Ultim8 Batch, all batch finalists returned, making the starting number of 16 housemates. The public did not decide who would return for this batch.

Prizes
As revealed during the announcement of the batch winners, each batch winner will receive ₱100,000. On the other hand, the ultimate winner would take home ₱2,000,000 (₱1,000,000 from Miniso and ₱1,000,000 from the show), a condominium unit  Suntrust Asmara from Suntrust Properties, Inc., a water refilling station business package worth ₱800,000, and a travel package worth ₱300,000 from Jag Jeans. The runner-up would receive ₱500,000 and a condominium unit from Suntrust Properties, Inc; the third and fourth placers would receive ₱300,000 and ₱200,000, respectively. ₱100,000 would be given to the fifth to eighth placers. Yen Quirante won a condominium unit from Suntrust Properties, Inc. during the third Pinoy Big Batch-Bakan.

Twists
Aside from the twist to the show's format, the following are the highlighted twists that had occurred during the run of this season.

 Star Dreamers and Camp Star Hunt – On the launch night, 16 potential shortlisted contestants, called Star Dreamers, were introduced on the live launch wherein they must undergo through the housemate selection process twist in order to earn housemate status. Only eight of these Star Dreamers would become official housemates. Those who failed the cut, were housed in the Camp Star Hunt. These Star Dreamers would then battle between themselves by earning points in order to replace those housemates evicted weekly. The introduction of these Star Dreamers continued up to the third batch; upon the entry of the fourth batch, no more Star Dreamers were introduced.
 Housemates vs. Star Dreamers
 2-in-1 Housemate – Two housemates who are related biologically are joined as one competing housemate, as assigned by Big Brother.

To disrupt normal selection processes in nominations, evictions, and even the finale to the determine the final four, Big Brother had given housemates several challenges of different formats for the five batches. For nominations and evictions, it had the Do-or-Die LigTask, The Duel, The Golden Circle and The Black Circle. For housemates to advance to the top group of any given batch, they had the Big Jump Challenge, Pinoy Big Batch-Bakan, and the Ultim8 Challenge.

Theme song
This season's theme song is "Otso Na" performed by co-hosts Toni and Alex Gonzaga where most elements (including the chorus) from Orange and Lemons's "Pinoy Ako," the franchise's theme song, were included in the song.

The season's eviction theme song was performed by Moira Dela Torre entitled "Before It Sinks In", written by herself and was part of her debut studio album "Malaya".

Housemates
On launch night on Days 1 and 2, official housemates were determined, from the chosen Star Dreamers from Star Hunt, through a series of challenges, by the council, and by the public. The council consists of past winners: season 1's Nene Tamayo, Celebrity 1's Keanna Reeves, Celebrity 2's Ruben Gonzaga, Teen Edition Plus's Ejay Falcon, Teen Edition 4's Myrtle Sarrosa, All In's Daniel Matsunaga, 737's Jimboy Martin, and Lucky 7's Maymay Entrata. On Day 2, three winners from the council were replaced by three ex-housemates: All In's Loisa Andalio, 737's Barbie Imperial, and Lucky 7's Edward Barber. The public chose a housemate through voting; the one with the most votes will become a housemate.

Below is a table of official housemates, and a collapsed table for shortlisted Star Dreamers staying at Camp Star Hunt.

Notes
 To reflect the actual numbering of days in the show and those posted in the show's social media accounts, the numbering of days is readjusted back to Day 1 upon the entry of a new batch.
  On Day 13, with the result of Mark's crossover to the Big Brother House as an official housemate, Big Brother announced that he will become a 2-in-1 housemate with his sister, Apey. But on Day 27, after gaining the public's and the housemates' vote, the two eventually were separated as a 2-in-1 housemate.
  denotes that Batch 1 Teens, Batch 2 Adults, and Batch 3 Teens did Temporary Exit until back to House on Day 1-6 of Ultim8 Batch
  Day 43 denotes that Akie, Argel, Kiara, and Wealand did not exit the House on Day 43; however, the Batch winner was determined on that specific day.
  The batch colors were officially introduced a few weeks before the determination of the Batch 4's Big 4.

Housemate selection history
Note that the term crossover, as used in the show, meant that the Star Dreamer had officially been an official housemate. However, in the case of Kim and Camille of batch two, they were still considered Star Dreamers when they crossed over to the House on Day 62. They eventually became official housemates on Day 68 upon the outcome of Pinoy Big Battle. No cross-overs had happened after The Gr8 C from batch three as the Camp had been abandoned.

Batch 1: Teens
This is the list of 88-second challenges for the first batch of teen housemates:
 #1: Star Dreamers must throw two balls on a string on to three level bars. Each bar corresponds to 1 point, 2 points, and 3 points. Each stringed balls that hung on to a corresponding bar are points added to their score. The one with the most points wins.
 #2: Star Dreamers must pick balls, corresponding to their assigned color, from a pool to a container. Each ball is 1 point added to their score. If they put a colored ball that is different from their assigned color, 1 point will be deducted to their score. The one with the most points wins.
 #3: Star Dreamers must stack water-filled bottles. The one with the highest level wins.
 #4: Star Dreamers must transfer balls through a relay course by balancing them on a plate. A big ball counts as 2 points, and a small one counts as 1 point. The one with the most points wins.

Notes
 Aljon and Gabby tied in first place. To break the tie, they have to race to put one ball into their container.
 Jelay and Missy tied in first place. To break the tie, they have to race to stack three water bottles without it being destroyed.

For Star Dreamers that didn't make the cut, they would be sent to the Camp. For them to crossover to the house, the team and individual scores of each will be added to determine their final points. The top four Star Dreamers with the most points will be up for public voting to determine who will become an official housemate. Once a Star Dreamer gets promoted as a housemate, another will come as their replacement.#1: Star Dreamers must prepare, and sell street foods for one hour. The team with the highest revenue gets higher points as a team. Individual points are also given based on their attitude and determination during the task.#2: Star Dreamers are tasked to create a fitness dance routine that will be taught to the public.#3: Star Dreamers must be able to buy junk materials with their given budget.#4: Star Dreamers are to create parols.#5: Star Dreamers are to write, act, and direct a short film, guided by Ces Quesada.

Batch 2: Adults
On January 6 and 7, sixteen Star Dreamers entered the Camp, which was divided into Camp A and Camp B. They were divided into two groups, and had undergone the Ultimate Star Dreamer Challenge. After the challenge, Big Brother chose eight official housemates.

On this batch, Big Brother introduced the process of dismissal. A Star Dreamer would be up for dismissal if they belonged to the losing group of a challenge for three consecutive times. The other safe Star Dreamers would vote on who they want to stay in the Camp; the Star Dreamer with the fewest votes would be dismissed. On the fifth challenge, Patrick was the only one up for dismissal, so he was dismissed immediately, and no voting took place.

On Day 55, Shawntel and Thea crossed over to the Big Brother House as the official housemates; it was revealed that after this crossover, there will be no new additional Star Dreamers that would enter the Camp. Later on, Aljur Abrenica entered the Camp as a Celebrity Star Player.

On Day 62, evicted housemates Abi, JC, Tori, and Wakim entered the Camp to become House Challengers, together with the other Star Dreamers.#1: Star Dreamers are to form the provided illustration of a key by stacking crayons.#2: Star Dreamers are to run a carinderia and must sell their chosen dishes to the public. The team with the highest sales and with a point from the carinderia manager wins the task. Prior to the task, they must prepare and serve their dishes to the housemates for a taste test.#3: Star Dreamers are to do housekeeping in a hotel. The points they receive will be added to their next job which is to run a flower shop. This is for the wedding of Mitch and Dudz.#4: Star Dreamers are to run a free hair and make-up salon.#5: Star Dreamers are to become kiddie party entertainers.#6: Star Dreamers are to become wet market fish vendors.#7: Star Dreamers are to become water aerobics instructors.#8: Star Dreamers are to become cadets during the Military Training week against the Housemates for the 1st Ultim8 Pinoy Big Battle.

Notes
  Colors indicate the division of Star Dreamers. The winning camp's advantage is that the first four housemates will come from their group. The other four housemates came from the losing camp.
  Kim and Camille crossed over to the House on Day 62 but their status as Star Dreamers were still retained. They became official housemates on Day 68 upon the House winning the second Pinoy Big Battle.

Batch 3: Teens

Notes
  The second batch of Teen Star Dreamers were introduced on March 31; but the set of official housemates were only introduced on April 7 and 8—Day 7 and 8, respectively. 
  These crossovers occurred on the same day, however it was broadcast on April 14 and 15. The housemates had to undergo a challenge in order to crossover the remaining Star Dreamers. Ashley and Batit crossed over during the Day 15 (April 14) episode, while Lance and Narcy crossed over during the Day 16 (April 15) episode.

Houseguests
To reflect the numbering of days in the show and those posted their social media, the day counter is adjusted back to Day 1 upon the entry of a new batch.

For batch one:
 Day 8: Dawn Chang, Mickey Perz, and Zeus Collins, judged the housemates in their dance painting. 
 Day 15:  Axel Torres, Bayani Agbayani, Janella Salvador, and McCoy de Leon helped the housemates in their 1st Big Celebr8ty Challenge. 
 Day 17: Canadian pop rock country band The Moffatts visited the House. 
 Day 21: Nyoy Volante teach the housemates in their celebrity impersonations. 
 Day 22: Billy Crawford, Jed Madela, and Melai Cantiveros judged their celebrity impersonation performances. 
 Day 29: Elsa Droga, Juliana Parizcova Segovia and,  Rufa Mae Quinto judged and assist the housemates in their 3rd Big Celebr8ty Challenge. 
 Day 34: Loisa Andalio, encouraged the housemates to gain revenue in their fifth weekly task.
 Days 35 and 36, Edward Barber and Maymay Entrata visited the house. The two helped the housemates in their last Decem-versus challenge. 
 Days 43 and 44: Darren Espanto, Jimboy Martin, Kyla, and Maris Racal judged the housemates' performances in their concert night.

For batch two:
 Day 11: ABS-CBN writer and stand-up comedian Alex Calleja entered the House in order to mentor them for their Otsoya Saya Task.
 Day 42: Liza Soberano and Enrique Gil entered the House to be guest directors for their acting task. 
 Day 50: International pop band Now United visited the House. 
 Day 55: Aljur Abrenica entered Camp Star Hunt to assist the Star Dreamers in Pinoy Big Battle. 
 Day 65 until the end of the week: Ogie Alcasid entered the House and Camp to mentor the housemates and Star Dreamers for their foot puppet competition.

For batch three:
 Day 49, Andrea Brillantes, Francine Diaz, Kyle Echarri and Seth Fedelin entered the house to pretend as housemates and challenged the housemates to give up their golden medallions.

For batch four:Day 16, Vice Ganda entered the house to greet the housemates & interact with them.

Weekly tasks

Notes
 This task was a partial failure, as the housemates didn't meet the task's requirements but Big Brother considered this task a pass.
 Housemates only won one of the two games, basketball; hence, they only received half of their weekly budget.
 Housemates only won one of the four games, Catch and Build; hence, they only received one-fourth of their weekly budget.
 Housemates only won one of the performances, with Team Mae; hence, they only received half of their weekly budget.

Challenges
Big Celebr8ty Challenge
In the first batch, the Ligtask was brought back in the form of the Big Celebr8ty Challenge. Every Saturday, the housemates would compete in a for immunity from nominations; there will be celebrity guests that would be participating for certain roles in the challenge. For the first week, Bayani Agbayani, Axel Torres from All In, Janella Salvador and McCoy de Leon from Lucky 7 took part in the challenge. For the second week of the challenge, Nyoy Volante, Melisa Cantiveros, Billy Crawford and Jed Madela judged the teen housemates' performance. For the third week of the challenge, Rufa Mae Quinto, and Elsa Droga and Juliana Pariscova Segovia of It's Showtime took part as actors for the said challenge.

Note

  Kaori was paired with Juliana after Aljon was disqualified to join due to his automatic nomination for numerous violations.

Housemates vs. Star Dreamers
Batch one participated in Decem-versus, and the mechanics are as follows: there are three challenges they have to go through, and the teams must race to win two out of three. If the housemates got defeated by Camp Star Hunt, there would be a double eviction and two Star Dreamers would crossover. If the housemates win, no double eviction will happen. On Day 33, Ali, Reign, and Rhys, who are originally from Camp Star Hunt, took the chance to help the Camp, leaving the five other housemates to compete in the second challenge. On Day 34, after the housemates lose their second challenge, the Camp had an 88-second advantage on their third challenge. On Day 36, Ali, Reign, and Rhys were given a chance to change their decision. Rhys was the only one who returned help the housemates. Edward Barber and Maymay Entrata entered the House to help the housemates. While the Camp won two out of three, the housemates were declared winners of Decem-versus, and no double eviction happened. The reason for this decision is unknown.

Batch two participated in Pinoy Big Battle. If the housemates win, all of them will be immune from eviction; otherwise, two Star Dreamers will crossover. Prior to the announcement of the first battle, Big Brother informed Shawntel and Thea that they will be separated during the final battle: one would stay with the housemates, and the other would be sent to help the Star Dreamers. The housemates, then, chose Shawntel to help the Star Dreamers. For the second battle on Day 68, Camille and Kim learned that they weren't officially housemates yet, and would only become one after the battle. They were tasked to lead the Housemates for the second battle, while Shawntel and Andre were sent to Camp Star Hunt to lead them respectively. Grace and Kin replaced them for the battle.

Big Jump
Housemates participate in various challenges to be a batch finalist. On Day 50 of batch one, Big Brother announced that one of the Star Dreamers can help one of the participants. They pick Jelay, and Gian was able to help her in the challenge. On Day 31 of batch four, for the first four challenges, two housemates participate on each.

Do-or-Die LigTask
As Karina, Rhys, and Seth forfeited their chance in the Big Jump, Big Brother made them participate in a Do-or-Die Ligtask. If all of them succeeded the challenge happening on Day 53, they will be safe from eviction; otherwise, one of them will get evicted.

The Duel
For batch two, housemates had to challenge another housemate to determine the duel participants. The winner of the duel would be safe, while the loser would be fake evicted from the House, be moved to a secret room in the House, and be nominated for eviction for that week.

Pinoy Big Bakbakan
For batch three's fourth and fifth weekly task, the housemates compete with the batch finalists of batches one and two. The challenges were played in pairs.

Golden Circle Challenges
For batch three's nominations and evictions, Big Brother implemented a new immunity challenge called the Golden Circle. Housemates would undergo the normal nomination process; nominees from this process would be barred from joining the challenge as they would already face the public vote. Remaining housemates would participate in the challenge to gain immunity. The losing housemates would join the earlier nominees to face the public vote.

Note

  Removed due to numerous violations
  Mich, having received the Black Circle, would be partnered with a mannequin, which later changed to his mother. During the course of the week, however, Emjay's and Mich's mothers got sick and were not able to participate in Mr. and Ms. PBB TeenM8, hence, Kyzha is later partnered with Mich.

Pinoy Big Batch-Bakan
On Day 7 of the Ultim8 Batch, it was revealed that the four batches will have to battle their way to earn the remaining 4 slots of the Big 8 (Big Otso, as referred by the show) through a series of elimination challenges called the Pinoy Big Batch-Bakan.  In every Big 8 slot, the batches will undergo a series of challenges until one batch emerges as the winner. With the exception of the batch winner, the members of the winning batch will then be voted by the public in order to determine the housemate who will get one of the Big 8 slots. The fifth, sixth and seventh slots were filled in this manner.

Notes
  As an advantage, Batch 2 was given the power to pick a teen Batch as an ally for the first round of the challenge, and later for the second round, as an opponent. Batch 2 choose Batch 3.
  With Batch 4's win, Batch 1 also won the first round of the challenge.
  The last part of the challenge was redone and invalidated the winning of Batch 1, after the said batch made some number scribbles in their table platform—the challenge was strictly a mental challenge.
  Fumiya gave his spot for the challenge to Yen; while Yamyam gave his spot to Karina.

Eighth spot
For the eighth and final throne, there are no elimination rounds. Instead, all batches will play in all rounds, and are ranked accordingly. The batch with the most points are eligible for the final throne. If Andre wins the challenge he automatically gets the throne, making the rest evicted. But if there is a tie between a batch or batch 1, 3, and 4 win, a vote will be done to see who will win.

Ultim8 Challenge
The Ultim8 Big Otso Housemates were subjected to another series of challenges to determine the Ultim8 Big 4. A day after the Big Otso was revealed, it was announced that the public was only given 50% of the penultimate vote to decide the Ultim8 Big 4. The other 50% was determined by 100 Gold Bars representing 1% each. Housemates would earn the Golden Bars through a series of challenges.

In the third and fourth challenges, there were finite sets of available bars. Big Brother told the Housemates to agree on a sequence among themselves since the tasks could only be performed by one of them at a time. If there were still available bars at the end of a round, the Housemates would play for the remaining bars in the same sequence. Conversely, the supply of gold bars may run out before the remaining Housemates ever had a chance to play; if this occurs, they would not be able to obtain any bar. The Housemates agreed on the same sequence for both rounds, which is: Ashley, Kaori, Lie, Fumiya, Yamyam, Lou, Kiara, Andre.

Golden bars earned

Notes
  Andre earned seven gold bars and gave two each to Fumiya, Lou and Yamyam, and one to Ashley; he received nothing from the other housemates.
  Ashley did not get any gold bar; but received three gold bars, one each from Andre, Kiara and Lou.
  Fumiya earned two gold bars and gave them all to Lie; he received three gold bars, two from Andre and one from Lou.
  Kaori did not get any gold bar; but received one gold bar from Kiara.
  Kiara earned two gold bars and gave one each to Ashley and Kaori; she received nothing from the other housemates.
  Lie did not get any gold bar; but received three gold bars, two from Fumiya and one from Lou.
  Lou earned four gold bars and gave one each to Ashley, Fumiya, Lie and Yamyam; she received two gold bars from Andre.
  Yamyam did not get any gold bar; but received three gold bars, two from Andre and one from Lou.

Nomination history
In every nomination, each housemate has to nominate two people with the first receiving two points and the second with one point.

Batch 1: Teens
During the merged batch twist, the Big 4 of this batch (namely: Jelay, Kaori, Lie and Karina) were dubbed as Solid 4G. The batch was later assigned with blue as the batch's official color and with the #Batch1AndOnly as the batch's official hashtag code. Their batch light sticks feature a blue heart.

The First Day, November 10, 2018 is the Day 1 of this batch, and Day 1 overall. January 6, 2019 is Day 58 of this batch, and Day 58 overall.

Legend

Notes
  Karina and Seth were chosen as the pair with the best performance during their weekly task. They were awarded ₱8,888 each and immunity for the first round of nominations.
  Aljon, Jelay, and Seth were nominated for violation of house rules. They are given a chance to save themselves from nomination by passing their fourth weekly task. In their weekly task, only two out of three balls were successfully shot, which means only two of them can be saved. The three chose Aljon to remain nominated.
  The Big Celebr8ty Challenge determined who was nominated for eviction. As Aljon was still automatically nominated, he could not participate in the challenge.
  Weekly task determined who was nominated for eviction.
  Missy voluntarily exited; feeling that the other Housemates who stayed longer than her deserved to win more. Before she exited from the house, Big Brother announced that the eviction will be canceled, due to Missy's voluntary exit.
  For forfeiting the first Big Jump Challenge, Big Brother gave a task to Karina, Rhys, and Seth to save themselves from eviction. They failed the task, forcing the three to take part in a Special Ligtask challenge where the loser would be evicted. Since Rhys finished last, he was automatically evicted from the House.
  Big Jump challenge determined who will be nominated for eviction. This was a double eviction.
  Voting for the Batch Winner was held prior to the Big Four exiting the house, with the percentages of the votes being revealed; but the actual standings of the Big Four were not revealed until Day 7 of the Ultim8 Batch on July 13, 2019.

Batch 2: Adults
During the merged batch twist, the Big 4 of this batch (namely: Lou, Andre, Yamyam, and Fumiya) were dubbed as Team LAYF. The batch was later assigned with green as the batch's official color and with the #Batch2getherForever as the batch's official hashtag code. Their batch light sticks feature a green star.

January 6, 2019 is the Day 1 of this batch, and Day 58 overall. March 31, 2019 is Day 85 of this batch, and Day 142 overall.LegendNotes
  During the first round of nominations, all the nomination points were given to Apey and none to Mark. However, since both are considered 2-in-1 housemates a nomination for one is a nomination for the other.
  On Day 27, after gaining the public's and the housemates' vote, Apey & Mark were separated as a 2-in-1 housemate (for details with the results, see 2-in-1 vote results).
  Wakim was automatically nominated after he had earned the most violations (11 violations) in the House. He was ineligible to be nominated on that week's nomination night, and only the two housemates with the most points were nominated that week.
  As a new housemate and having entered partway through the week, Tori was exempt from nominations.
  As a new housemate and having entered partway through the week,  was exempt from nominations.
  As a new housemate, JC was exempt from nominations. No nominations took place as the weekly task determined who was nominated for eviction. This was also a double eviction.
  The housemates had to participate in Duel Challenge, wherein the losing housemates were automatically evicted and the winners would become the Big Four, as told by Big Brother. But unknown to them, the losing housemates were only falsely evicted, moving to a secret room in the house rather than leaving the house; not knowing that their stay in the House were extended from 8 weeks to 88 days (or roughly more than 12 weeks). Yamyam, Andre, Lou, and Fumiya were automatically nominated after losing their respective challenges to Mark, Hanie,  and JC.
  The result of the Ultim8 Pinoy Big Battle against the Star Dreamers was determined if the housemates were be saved from the eviction or not. As Camp Star Hunt won, the Housemates faced a double eviction. Thea, as team leader of the housemates, was automatically nominated as a result. Conversely, Shawntel as the leader of Camp Star Hunt, was immune from nominations.
  As Andre and Shawntel were leaders of Camp Star Hunt and lost the 2nd Pinoy Big Battle, they were automatically nominated. Camille and Kim as leaders of the Housemates, were immune from being nominated for winning.
  Fumiya was automatically nominated after he and Yamyam lost the first Big Jump challenge. Round 2 of the Big Jump Challenger determined who was nominated. As Andre, Lou, and Yamyam won, they were immune from eviction. Everyone else was nominated. This was a double eviction.
  Voting for the Big Four started on Day 78 and the results were announced on March 27.
  Voting for the Batch Winner started after the Big Four was revealed.
  Voting for the Batch Winner was held prior to the Big Four exiting the house, with the percentages of the votes being revealed; but the actual standings of the Big Four were not revealed until Day 7 of the Ultim8 Batch on July 13, 2019.

2-in-1 vote results
On Day 27, within 88 minutes after the eviction night episode, the housemates and the public voted in whether Apey & Mark should continue as a 2-in-1 housemate. The housemates received 50% of the vote while the public got the other 50%. The table below was the official results of the poll and was revealed on Day 28. However, Apey & Mark were earlier informed of the possible split of the two. They were briefed that after 88 minutes', the two will know the results through the lamp posts placed in the pool area. With one already lit, if another lamp post will be lit, it would mean that they will be separated as individual housemates. After the said period, the second lamp posts were lit indicating their separation from being a 2-in-1 housemate.

Batch 3: Teens
During the merged batch twist, the Big 4 of this batch (namely: Tan, Batit, Ashley, and Yen) were dubbed as Team TBAY. The batch was later assigned with red as the batch's official color and with the #BatchUltimate3hreat as the batch's official hashtag code. Their batch light sticks feature a red flame.

March 31, 2019 is the Day 1 of this batch, and Day 142 overall. May 26, 2019 is Day 57 of this batch, and Day 198 overall.

Legend

Notes
  During the first nominations, Mich, Narcy, and Shami received the most nomination points. They are nominated and were excluded from participating in a series of Golden Circle Challenges. 
  Alfred, Emjay, Ashley, Jem, Lance, Angela, Batit, and Kyzha earned their Golden Circles and thus were saved from upcoming eviction for the week. The following eviction was a double eviction.
  During the second nominations, Alfred, Gwen, and Shoichi received the most nomination points and were barred from participating in the Golden Circle Challenges for the week.
  Lance and Batit earned their spot during the first set of Golden Circle Challenge. Angela and Yen earned their spot during the second Golden Circle Challenge. However, due to violation, Yen was stripped off of her Golden Circle and was automatically nominated for the week, together with Jem. Emjay, Mich, Tan, Sheena, and Kyzha were the last 5 to complete the 8 Golden Circles. The second eviction night was a triple eviction.
  The housemates faced a face-to-face nomination wherein the housemate to receive the most Black Circle would be put on automatic nomination. Mich, receiving 3 Black Circles, was automatically nominated and was given a disadvantage at Mr. and Ms. PBB TeenM8 2019.
  Mr. and Ms. PBB TeenM8 2019 determined who was nominated for eviction. Winners Batit and Sheena and Runners-Up Shoichi and Yen earned their Golden Circles and were safe for the upcoming triple eviction.
  While Emjay was initially competing in Mr. and Ms. PBB TeenM8 2019, he later contracted an illness which forced him out of the competition, automatically nominating him. He would later be Force Evicted, resulting in only two people leaving the house come eviction night, instead of the planned triple eviction.
  Big Jump Challenge determined who was nominated. Batit won the first Big Jump Challenge. Lance and Tan, who reached Round 2 of Big Jump Challenge were both safe from eviction. Shoichi and Yen are automatically nominated for not taking part of the Big Jump Challenge. Angela, Ashley, and Sheena were put on nomination for not reaching Round 2 of the Big Jump Challenge.
  Big Brother gave the housemates an individual task except Batit. Unknown to them, they were actually fighting for the second Big Jump Challenge. Tan won the second Big Jump Challenge. Voting for Big 4 was immediately opened right after the announcement of Tan's win.
 Voting for the Batch Winner was held prior to the Big Four exiting the house, with the percentages of the votes being revealed; but the actual standings of the Big Four were not revealed until Day 7 of the Ultim8 Batch on July 13, 2019.

Batch 4: Adults
During the merged batch twist, the Big 4 of this batch (namely: Wealand, Argel, Kiara, and Akie) were dubbed as Team WAKA. The batch was later assigned with yellow as the batch's official color and with the #Batch4TheWin as the batch's official hashtag code. Their batch light sticks feature a yellow sun.

May 26, 2019 is the Day 1 of this batch, and Day 198 overall. July 7, 2019 is Day 43 of this batch, and Day 240 overall.

Legend

Notes
  Banjo was force evicted after he had made sexist jokes, causing the girls to feel uncomfortable. Despite this, the eviction of that week was not canceled.
  Gino, Kiara and Argel were nominated by the housemates as leaders of an, at that time, unknown task. The housemates were later divided into three groups: Gino with Aki and Diana (Team Gino); Kiara with Sky and Hasna (Team Kiara); and Argel with Franki and Wealand (Team Argel). As part of their weekly task, each team was required to openly vote 4 housemates they wanted to nominate. The nominated housemates were not yet considered official as, at the end of the weekly task, only the members of the two losing teams will become officially nominated. However, on Day 27, after the numerous stealing incidents that happened in the week's competition, Big Brother decided to disregard the earlier open nomination (thus, the reason for the struck out votes in the table), and instead decided to place all the members of the would-be two losing teams as the official nominees. On Day 28, Team Gino won the group task, thereby placing the Teams Argel and Kiara as automatically nominated.
  Big Jump Challenge determined who was nominated. Akie, as winner of the Big Jump Challenge, had to choose two housemates to face off in a Ligtask challenge, with the winner being safe. Akie chose Argel and Wealand, with the former winning the LigTask. The following eviction night was a double eviction.
  Unlike in the previous three batches, this Batch did not have a B8gating Salubong as the Big 4 of this batch remained in the House and became part of the Ultim8 Batch. 
  Voting for the Batch Winner was held prior to the start of the Ultim8 Batch, with the percentages of the votes being revealed; but the actual standings of the Big Four were not revealed until Day 7 of the Ultim8 Batch on July 13, 2019.

Ultim8 Batch
Note that July 7, 2019 served as the Day 1 of this batch, which is the Day 240 of this season. The last day, August 4, 2019, is Day 29 for this batch and is the Day 268 of this season.

Batch membership
  Batch 1

  Batch 2

  Batch 3

  Batch 4

Legend

Note
  The Batch Winner was revealed on Day 7. For becoming the Batch Winners; Lie, Yamyam, Ashley, and Kiara were automatically given spots to the Big Night. For the voting percentages, refer to the above tables.
  Upon losing the final Big Batch-Bakan; Batit, Jelay, Karina, Tan, and Yen were all evicted. Batch 3 and Batch 4 tied for first place in the Batch-Bakan; thus, both batches were up for voting for the Eighth Big Otso slot. The unselected Housemates were also evicted that night.
  In addition to the public voting, the Ultim8 Big Otso competed in the Ultim8 Challenge where they would win Golden Bars that would earn them votes to become part of the Ultim8 Big Four. Half of the votes were determined by the challenge, while the other half of the votes came from the Public.
  After the Ultim8 Big 4 was determined, the voting percentages of the four housemates were reset to zero.

Celebr8 at the Big Night
The Big Night for this season was held at the AATF Sports Complex in Imus, Cavite on August 3 and 4, 2019. The finale featured variety of Kapamilya stars, Ex-Star Dreamers, Ex-housemates and other former housemates including past Pinoy Big Brother Big Winners such as Nene Tamayo of Season 1, Keanna Reeves of Celebrity 1, Ejay Falcon of Teen Plus, James Reid of Teen Clash, Myrtle Sarrosa of Teen 4, Daniel Matsunaga of All In, Miho Nishida and Jimboy Martin of 737 and Maymay Entrata of Lucky 7, the 2nd Big Placers such as Jason Gainza of Season 1, Ryan Bang of Teen Clash, Maris Racal of All In and Ylona Garcia of 737, the 3rd Big Placers such as Wendy Valdez of Season 2, Jane Oineza of All In and Yong Muhajil of Lucky 7, the 4th Big Placers such as Gee-Ann Abrahan of Season 2, Will Devaughn of Celebrity 2, Joj and Jai Agpangan of Teen 4, Dawn Chang of 737 and Edward Barber of Lucky 7, and other former housemates including evicted, forced eviction, and voluntary exit such as previous seasons of Pinoy Big Brother. On August 3, the combined result of the Ultim8 Challenge and the public's votes determined the final standing of the Big Otso. At the end of the night of August 3, the 5th to 8th placers exited the show. For August 4, the scores of the Ultim8 Big 4 were reset to zero. At this time, the public's votes alone determined the 4th to 2nd placers, and lastly the Ultim8 Big Winner.

Official soundtrack

Star Music together with ABS-CBN created an album for this season entitled Ang Soundtrack Ng Bahay Mo'' and was released on May 12, 2019.

References

External links
 Pinoy Big Brother Official website

Pinoy Big Brother seasons
2018 Philippine television seasons
2019 Philippine television seasons